Cyllopsis gemma, the gemmed satyr, is a species of butterfly of the family Nymphalidae. It is found in the southeastern United States and northeastern Mexico.

The wingspan is 35–43 mm. Adults are on wing from April to September in the northern parts of its range and year round in the south.

The larvae probably feed on Cynodon dactylon.

Subspecies
There are two recognised subspecies:
Cyllopsis gemma gemma
Cyllopsis gemma freemani

References

External links
 Butterflies and Moths of North America

Satyrini
Butterflies described in 1808
Butterflies of North America
Taxa named by Jacob Hübner